Great Packington is a hamlet, civil parish and country park in the North Warwickshire district of Warwickshire, England. The parish of Meriden is to the south-east, and Little Packington to the west. At Great Packington is Packington estate, which includes Packington Hall, Packington Old Hall and St James' Church.

History
At the publication of the Domesday Book in 1086, (Great) Packington and Little Packington were recorded as Patitone, where the first t is a mistake for c, i.e. Pacitone. The settlement of 15 households was within the hundred of Coleshill in Warwickshire. The tenant-in-chief was Thorkil of Warwick, who held land and a number of manors in Warwickshire. His descendants are one of only three families that can document their lineage in the male line back to Anglo-Saxon times. The hundred was first called by its present name of Hemlingford Hundred in the Pipe Roll of 8 Henry II (1161–62), presumedly after the site of the hundred court had been relocated.

References

External links

Hamlets in Warwickshire